Ziyi may refer to:
Ziyi, Cyprus or Zygi, a village in the south of Cyprus between Limassol and Larnaca
 Ziyi, Chapter 33 in the Classic of Rites

People with the given name
Guo Ziyi (697–781), Chinese general during the Tang Dynasty
Zhang Ziyi (born 1979), Chinese actress
Yuan Ziyi, a character in Other Tales of the Flying Fox